The following is a list of shopping malls in Israel.

In Israel, use of the word kanyon is a play on the words "kana", which means "to buy", and "henyon", which means "parking space" (due to the large amount of parking spaces near the mall), while at the same time sounding like the English word canyon. With the establishment of this mall, the word kanyon entered the Hebrew language. The word is now used to describe any covered shopping centre and many malls in Israel since then have been named with "kanyon" in their title.

Tel Aviv District

Tel Aviv
Azrieli Center
Dizengoff Center
Gan Ha'ir
London Ministores Mall (Used for small businesses)
Mikado Center
Ramat Aviv Mall
TLV Fashion Mall
Weizmann City

Giv'atayim
Giv'atayim Mall
Friendly Borochov

Herzliya
Arena Mall
Outlet Herzliya
Seven Stars Mall (Shivat Hakokhavim)

Ramat Gan
Ayalon Mall
Bialik Mall
Dan Design Center
Marom Mall

Ramat HaSharon
Cinema City Glilot

Holon
Holon Mall
Mega Or Wolfson

Bat Yam 
Bat Yam Mall
Bat Yamon

Or Yehuda
Or Yehuda Outlet

Kiryat Ono 
Kiryat Ono Mall

Central District

Rishon LeZion
Azrieli Rishonim
BIG Rishon LeZion
G City (Cinema City)
G Rothschild Center
Kanyon Hazahav (Golden Mall)
Lev Rishon

Netanya
Alexandra Yachin Poleg Mall
BIG Poleg
Hadarim Mall
HaSharon Mall
Ir Yamim Mall
Irusim Mall

Yehud
Savyonim Mall

Petah Tikva
 Barukh Center
 Em Hamoshavot Mall
 Lev HaIr Mall
 Ovnat Mall (The Big Mall)
 Sirkin Mall

Rehovot
American City
Rehovot Mall

Ra'anana
Azrieli Ra'anana (Park Mall)
Renanim Mall

Kfar Saba
Arim Mall
G Kfar Saba
Green Kfar Saba Mall (Kfar Saba HaYeruka)

Hod HaSharon
Azrieli Hod HaSharon Mall (Margalit HaSharon Mall)
Sharonim Mall

Giv'at Shmuel
HaGiva Mall
Rogovin Center Giv'at Shmuel

Ramla
Kiryat Ramla Mall
Ramla Mall
Kanion Ramlod (Ramlot Center)

Lod
Lod Center Mall

Modi'in-Maccabim-Re'ut 
Ispro Center Modiin
Mega Or Modiin
Modiin Mall

Yavne 

 G Yavne Mall
 Rogovin Center Yavne

Haifa District

Haifa
Castra Mall
Grand Canyon
Haifa Hof HaCarmel Central Bus Station
Haifa Mall
Horev Center
Hutzot HaMifratz mall
Lev Hamifratz Mall
Panorama Center

Krayot

Kiryon Mall
Azrieli Kiryat Ata
Sha'ar HaTzafon Mall
BIG Kiryat Ata

Hadera
Ganei Hadarim
Hadera Mall
Lev Hadera Mall
Mall Ha'Hof Village
Mul Hakikar Mall

Pardes Hana Karkur 

 Alon Ein Shemer Fashion

Or Akiva
Orot Mall

Northern District

Afula
Amakim Mall

Tiberias
BIG Fashion Danilof Mall
BIG Tiberias
Tiberias Central Bus Station

Tamra
Tamra mall

Yarka
Canaan Mall
City Mall
Big Fashion Yarka Mall

Karmiel
Kikkar ha ʕir Mall
Lev Karmiel Mall
Ḥucot Karmiˀel Mall

Nazareth
Big Fashion Mall

Nof HaGalil
Ofer Dodge Center

Ma'alot-Tarshiha
Kochav Hatsafon

Kiryat Shmona
Nehemya Mall

Nahariya
Arena Nahariya Mall
Nahariya Mall (HaTzafon Mall)

Rosh Pinna
Galil Center

Akko
Azrieli Akko
Acre Mall

Jerusalem District

Jerusalem
Center One
Central Bus Station Mall
Clal Center
Hadar Mall
Lev Talpiyot
Malha Mall
Mamilla Mall
Rav Chen Mall
Ramot Mall
Yisrael Talpiot Mall

Beit Shemesh
BIG Beit Shemesh
Naimi Mall
Sha'ar HaIr Mall

Mevaseret Zion
Harel Mall
Mevaseret Mall

Southern District

Ashdod
Ashdod Mall
Big Fashion Ashdod
City Mall
Lev Ashdod
Star Center
Sea Mall

Beersheba
Avia Mall
BIG Beersheba
Grand Canyon Beersheba
Ispro Planet
Kiryat HaMemeshala Mall
Negev Mall
ONE Plaza
Shaul HaMelekh Mall

Ashkelon
 Giron Mall
 Hutzot Mall 
 Lev Ashkelon 
 Marina Mall

Sderot
Lev HaIr

Arad
Arad Mall

Kiryat Gat
Gat Center
Lev Ha'Ir Mall

Mitzpe Ramon 

 Even Derech Center

Tamar Regional Council 

 Dead Sea Mall
 Sky Blue Mall

Eilat
Ice Mall
Mall HaYam Mall

References

External links
IsraelMalls.net :: Shopping Centers, Malls , Chain Stores, Restaurants, Movies Entertainment in Israel :: Best Malls
Shopping in Jerusalem | The Complete Guide - GoJerusalem.com

Israel
 
Shopping malls